Parris, Texas is a community that once existed just south of Melissa in central Collin County near the banks of the East Fork of the Trinity River.

History
In 1859 Thaddeus Parris, a Mexican–American War veteran for whom the community was named built an ox-turned gristmill at this location. This attracted settlers of the area during the next decade and until sometime in the late nineteenth or early twentieth century Parris remained a community center for area farmers.

Further reading
 Collin County Genealogical & Historical Records, Probate Minutes - 1871-1879 - Volume B-1 - pp 47–50, Estate of Thaddeus Parris 
 Collin County Genealogical & Historical Records, Probate Minutes - 1871-1879 - Volume B-1 - pp 51–82, Estate of Thaddeus Parris

References

External links
 TopoQuest
 Roadside Thoughts

Ghost towns in North Texas
Ghost towns in Texas